Kure Beach is a town in New Hanover County, North Carolina, United States, approximately 15 miles south of Wilmington. It is part of the Wilmington Metropolitan Statistical Area. The population was 2,012 at the 2010 census. It is found on Pleasure Island directly south of the Wilmington Beach annex of Carolina Beach and just north of Fort Fisher.

History
A post office called Kure Beach has been in operation since 1942. The town was named for a family of settlers.

The Kure Beach Fishing Pier is one of the oldest on the Atlantic Coast. The original pier was built in 1923 and has been rebuilt and restored several times since then due to wear and tear over the years.

On the night of July 24–25, 1943, a German U-boat fired at least three shells to attack the Ethyl-Dow Chemical Company plant at Kure's Beach (post-war: Kure Beach), but instead hit the Cape Fear River.  The plant was the only one on the East Coast producing bromine from seawater for use in aviation gasoline.
  Other historians dispute whether the attack actually occurred, and there is no corroborating physical evidence or logs from the German Navy.

Demographics

2020 census

As of the 2020 United States census, there were 2,191 people, 951 households, and 601 families residing in the town.

2000 census
As of the census of 2000, there were 1,507 people, 723 households, and 495 families residing in the town. The population density was 1,931.6 people per square mile (746.0/km2). There were 1,560 housing units at an average density of 1,999.6 per square mile (772.2/km2). The racial makeup of the town was 98.74% White, 0.07% African American, 0.13% Native American, 0.07% Asian, 0.07% from other races, and 0.93% from two or more races. Hispanic or Latino of any race were 0.93% of the population.

There were 723 households, out of which 15.1% had children under 18 living with them, 61.3% were married couples living together, 5.1% had a female householder with no husband present, and 31.5% were non-families. 26.7% of all households were made up of individuals, and 8.7% had someone living alone 65 years of age or older. The average household size was 2.08, and the average family size was 2.48.

The population was spread out in the town, with 12.0% under the age of 18, 4.5% from 18 to 24, 22.5% from 25 to 44, 42.3% from 45 to 64, and 18.7% who were 65 years of age or older. The median age was 50 years. For every 100 females, there were 94.2 males. For every 100 females age 18 and over, there were 91.6 males.

The median income for a household in the town was $47,143, and the median income for a family was $55,875. Males had a median income of $32,708 versus $30,735 for females. The per capita income for the town was $26,759. About 4.1% of families and 5.7% of the population were below the poverty line, including 8.3% of those under age 18 and 3.5% of those age 65 or over.

New Hanover County School System 

In this area of North Carolina elementary school children will be zoned for Carolina Beach Elementary School,
middle school children zoned for Murray Middle School, and zoned for high school, Ashley High School or an early college high school including:

Isaac Bear Early College High School (UNCW)

Wilmington Early College High School (CFCC)

References

External links

 Town of Kure Beach Website

Towns in New Hanover County, North Carolina
Towns in North Carolina
Beaches of North Carolina
Cape Fear (region)
Landforms of New Hanover County, North Carolina
Populated coastal places in North Carolina